Honda Campus All-Star Challenge (also known as HCASC) is a quizbowl academic competition for Historically Black Colleges and Universities (HBCUs). The game was created and co-founded by Richard Reid, president and owner of the College Bowl Company, which produces the program. The sponsor of HCASC is American Honda Motor Company. “HCASC exemplifies the aims of a liberal arts education by encouraging students to develop a mastery in multiple academic fields,” says Dr. Worth K. Hayes of Tuskegee University.

History
Honda had Muse Cordero Chen, an advertising agency, do multiple focus groups in several major cities across the country to identify issues facing the African American community and their attitude towards Honda. One of the concerns they identified was African Americans wanted companies to be more responsive for the needs of their community, particularly in the regards to education. Afterwards education became a key element for Honda in advertising and public relations campaigns aimed at the African American audience. The agency helped Honda developed the Honda Campus All-Star challenge to help meet this need.

In 1989 Honda proposed a program to the College Bowl Company for HBCUs.  College Bowl created a program in which all 4-year degree-granting HBCUs are eligible to enroll teams, and all participating HBCUs receive grants. From 1990 to 1995, the National Championship games were broadcast on BET. These televised competitions were hosted by Clint Holmes. The college bowl type of competition became popular in the '60 and 70's, but it was rarely if ever, that African Americans were even allowed to compete in these tournaments. The HCASC was the first opportunity for black students to publicly display their talents, and airing the finals on cable television gave them an even larger audience who could see the event.

Game format
From 1990 to 1995, the competition format consisted of sectional matches that led up to televised National Championship games on BET. The current basic format was adopted in 1996, which abandoned the sectional games and the televising of games in favor of an all-encompassing 64-team National Championship Tournament (NCT) held each spring. From the 2010 to the 2019 season, only 48 teams qualified each year. In 2020 due to the COVID-19 pandemic the tournament was canceled. Since 2021, the format returned to a 64-team tournament.

1989-2011

From 1989 to 2011, Honda Campus All-Star Challenge used the same gameplay structure as two of its sister shows, College Bowl and University Challenge.

Gameplay took place during two eight-minute halves and included toss-up and bonus questions. Toss-up questions were always 10 points in value and a correct response on a toss-up gave the team the right to answer a bonus question, which could be worth 20, 25, or 30 possible points. The toss-up questions did not permit conferring with other team members, with buzzers (using a lockout system) being used to designate who rang in to answer a question. Players could ring in before the moderator had completed the question (also known as an interrupt) but if an incorrect answer was given, the team would receive a five-point deduction, and the question was completed for the other team.

Teams could confer on bonuses, but responses were only accepted from the captain (or a designated player if the captain chose one). If team members had conflicting answers, then the captain would speak on behalf of the team. The bonus question might be one "all or nothing" question worth the full amount of the bonus, or could be a series of questions giving the team a chance to receive a portion of the maximum points (i.e. a 30-point bonus made up of three 10 point questions). Other bonuses might require a team to name items from a list at 5 points apiece, or award points based on how many clues it took the team to identify a famous person, place, or thing (a 30-20-10 bonus). Only the team who answered the tossup correctly got to answer the bonus question; there were no opportunities to "rebound".

At the end of two halves, the team with the higher score won the game. In case of a tie, toss-up questions were asked until there was a change in score (either one team answered correctly for 10 points, or interrupted with an incorrect answer, losing 5 points and the game.)

2011-Present

Beginning with the 2011–12 season, the format was changed to reflect that of the Zain Africa Challenge, another academic competition created by Richard Reid, owned and produced by College Bowl.

Game play takes place over four rounds. The first three rounds are called Face Off Rounds. In each of the Face Off rounds, there are two types of questions: toss-ups, worth 10 points each and bonuses, worth 20 points. In each of the three Face Off rounds, a different player represents the team answering Face Off questions. That player is the only one who can ring in and answer for his or her team.

Each round has four categories in play. The team who wins a coin toss decides the first category. After the entire question is read, the first player to signal gets to answer. If they answer correctly, the team gets a bonus question. If their answer is incorrect, the player representing the other team gets a chance to answer. Bonus questions come from the same category as their respective Face Off questions, are played by the entire team, and are always worth a possible 20 points. The team who answered the last correct tossup gets to choose the next category. In each category there are four face-off questions- once the fourth and final face-off question in a category is read, the category is out of play. At the beginning of Rounds 2 and 3, the face-off representative changes, and the team who is behind selects the category for the opening Face Off question.

At the end of the three face-off rounds, play moves to the fourth and final round, called the Ultimate Challenge. The team that's behind plays first, and selects one of four new categories. The team has 60 seconds to answer 10 questions, each worth 25 points. An incorrect answer is not penalized, but the moderator moves on to the next question, and as long as there is time remaining, teams can keep coming back to questions that they missed or passed on. After the trailing team plays, their opponents choose one of the three remaining categories to play. After both teams have played the Ultimate Challenge, the team in the lead wins. If there is a tie, the teams play Face Off questions until there is a change in score.

Personnel
A moderator, who reads the questions
A resetter, who opens and resets the lockout (buzzers) system as appropriate,
A scorekeeper
A division team leader, who assists the game officials and teams, enforces procedural rules, and is in charge of the game room
Two teams, each of up to three players and an alternate, with one player designated as captain
Coach for each team
A timekeeper (1990-2002); computer equipment made this position obsolete

Nationals

Qualifying stage
As part of a qualification process, each college/university must host a campus tournament to determine which players will represent the school's team. Schools must qualify for the NCT by competing in one of the National Qualifying Tournaments (NQT) that take place in February. 48 schools are chosen for the NCT based on their NQT performance and previous years' performance at the NCT. Schools may increase their chances of qualifying via other ways announced by HCASC officials, including service projects and  "Rep My School" contests. Defending champions automatically qualify for the tournament.

The National Championship Tournament
After the NQTs are completed, qualifying schools compete at the National Championship Tournament (NCT). Teams are placed into eight divisions and play every team in their division once. The divisions are named after famous African Americans, with two of the eight divisions renamed each year. The preliminary round consists of divisional round robin games. The two teams from each division with the best win/loss record move onto the round of 16 playoffs. Teams are seeded based on overall performance, and the "super sixteen," "great eight," quarterfinal, and semifinal matches are single elimination, with the final two teams playing a best two-of-three series of final matches. Clint Holmes, who hosted the BET broadcasts, moderated the semifinal and final matches through 2008. Beginning in 2009, moderators from the Round Robin have been used during the on-stage games on the final game day.

The tournament begins with an opening banquet, and concludes with a closing banquet/awards ceremony. Both banquets include speakers and entertainers. Since 2004, the opening banquet has also introduced new members into the HCASC Hall of Fame.

Tournament format

Grants
For their efforts, schools that qualify for the NCT are awarded grants. The grant awards were updated for the 2015–16 season.
The NCT Champion school is awarded $75,000
Runner-Up earns $30,000
Semi-Finalists earn $20,000
Quarter-Finalists earn $10,000
Playoff Qualifiers earn $6,000
NCT qualifiers earn $3,000
An additional $1,000 grant is awarded to the schools of All-Star players, so designated as being the top individual scorers in each of the 8 divisions.
The recipient of the Sportsperson of the Year Award earns their school an additional $1,000 grant

National Championship Tournament History

1990-2009
1990
In the first National Championship, West Virginia State defeated Alcorn State in the finals that took place at Howard University in Washington, D.C. The Challenge received a special commendation from then President George H. W. Bush.  
1991
Florida A&M University defeated defending champs West Virginia State in the finals. 
1995
Jackson State University defeated Howard University in the finals that took place in Los Angeles, California. Participants received tributes from the mayors and governors in their college's home cities and states, as well as ones from Presidents Bill Clinton & Nelson Mandela. 
1998
Florida A&M defeated Tuskegee University in the finals at Walt Disney World in Orlando, Florida. As winners they got to have an Oval Office meeting with President Bill Clinton.
1999
Florida A&M University won their second consecutive title defeating Clark-Atlanta University in the finals that took place in Washington D.C. 
2002
Morehouse College won their second straight championship in a matchup against Howard University that took place in Orlando, FL.

2010-Present
2014
Fisk University won their first championship, defeating Oakwood University  at the American Honda Motor Company's campus in Torrance, California. Oakwood University coach R. Rennae Elliott was named Coach of the Year.
2015
Prairie View A&M University defeated Cheyney University of Pennsylvania in the finals that took place in Torrance, California. Moderator for the finals was attorney Pridgen "PJ" Green who was an HCASC alumni from Hampton University.
2016
Florida A&M University won their 8th national championship against Chicago State University. For the second year in a row the finals were both took place in Torrance, California, and moderated by Pridgen Green.
2017
Oakwood University defeated Bowie State University at the finals in Torrance, California. Bowie State's coach Robert Batten won Coach of the Year.
2019
Spelman College defeated Florida A&M University in the finals. Coach Daniel Bascelli from Spellman won Coach of the year.
2020
The 2020 national championship was cancelled due to the COVID-19 pandemic. Honda instead redirect the funds from the program to the HBCU's to support their local communities. 
2021
North Carolina A&T University wins their first championship, defeating Florida A&M in the finals. The competition took place virtually due to the ongoing COVID-19 pandemic. 

2022
Morehouse College wins their 5th championship, defeating  Kentucky State University in the finals. For second year in a row, the competition was an virtual event. Morehouse's coach Robert Myrick was named Coach of the Year.

Year by Year Finalists

Numbers in parentheses denote multiple championships

See also
Honda Battle of the Bands

References
General
 - Historical reference of Finalist and Semi-Finalist.
Citations

External links
Honda Campus All-Star Challenge official site
Honda HCASC Website 
College Bowl, Distributor of HCASC

Student quiz competitions
Honda